South China Normal University Station or Huashi Station is a station of Line 3 of the Guangzhou Metro. It started operations on 30 December 2006. It is located at the junction of Tianhe Road North and Wushan Road in Tianhe District. Its name is derived from the nearby South China Normal University.

Station layout

Exits

See other 
South China Normal University

References

Railway stations in China opened in 2006
Guangzhou Metro stations in Tianhe District
Railway stations in China at university and college campuses